Piazza Vittorio Emanuele II may refer to:
 Piazza Vittorio Emanuele II (Rome) 
Piazza Vittorio Emanuele II (Rome Metro), a station on the Rome Metro
 Piazza Vittorio Emanuele II (Florence) in Florence, now known as Piazza della Repubblica